Maximikha is a rural locality (a village) in Bereznikovskoye Rural Settlement, Sobinsky District, Vladimir Oblast, Russia. The population was 13 as of 2010.

Geography 
Maximikha is located 28 km southeast of Sobinka (the district's administrative centre) by road. Kosmino is the nearest rural locality.

References 

Rural localities in Sobinsky District